Binahari is a Papuan language of New Guinea. Binahari-Ma is a dialect or a closely related language.

References

Languages of Papua New Guinea
Mailuan languages